The Broken Melody is a 1929 British romance film directed by Fred Paul and starring Georges Galli, Andrée Sacré and Enid Stamp-Taylor.  It was originally made as a silent film, with sound added later. The film was shot at Cricklewood Studios and distributed by Paramount Pictures. It was based on a play by Herbert Keith and James Leader. An exiled Prince living in Paris, begins a daliance with an opera singer before returning to his wife.

Cast
 Georges Galli as Prince Paul
 Andrée Sacré as Bianca 
 Enid Stamp-Taylor as Gloria 
 Cecil Humphreys as Gen. Delange 
 Mary Brough as Marthe 
 Albert Brouett as Jacques

References

Bibliography
 Low, Rachael. History of the British Film, 1918-1929. George Allen & Unwin, 1971.

External links

1929 films
1929 romance films
British romance films
Films directed by Fred Paul
British silent feature films
British films based on plays
Films set in Paris
Films shot at Cricklewood Studios
British black-and-white films
1920s English-language films
1920s British films